Cedar–University is a station on the RTA Red Line in Cleveland, Ohio. The station is located in University Circle at the foot of Cedar Hill along Cedar Glen Parkway (which connects Cleveland's Cedar Avenue with Cleveland Heights's Cedar Road).

The station also connects with Circle Link shuttle buses operated by Case Western Reserve University. The Circle Link buses stop at the corner of East 114th Street and Glenwood Avenue at the northern entrance to the station.

History
The station opened along with the rest of the CTS Rapid Transit on March 15, 1955 and was originally named "University Circle Rapid Station." As originally constructed, the station had entrances and bus loading lanes on both sides of Cedar east of the rail tracks. In addition, there was a bus loop with loading area southwest of the station at the corner of Cedar Avenue and Martin Luther King Jr. Drive.

In October 2010, federal funds were secured for a complete reconstruction of the station and to bring it into full ADA compliance. Ground was broken on September 19, 2012 and the new station opened on August 28, 2014. Upon its reopening, the station was given the new name of Cedar–University.
The new facility reconstructed the rail station in the same general location, but the entrance on the south side of Cedar was closed and removed and the south bus loading lane was also eliminated. The bus loop transfer zone was rebuilt and moved to the northeast corner of the intersection of Cedar Avenue and Martin Luther King Jr. Drive.

Station layout

Notable places nearby
 University Circle
 Case School of Engineering
 Little Italy
 Cedar Glen Apartments
 Cleveland FES Center
 Alcazar Hotel
 First Church of Christ, Scientist
 John Hay High School
 Case Western Reserve University
 Case Comprehensive Cancer Center

References

Red Line (RTA Rapid Transit)
University Circle
Railway stations in the United States at university and college campuses
Railway stations in the United States opened in 1955
1955 establishments in Ohio